Malte Ludin is a German filmmaker. He was born in Bratislava, Slovakia in 1942.

He studied political science at the Free University of Berlin.

Malte was the youngest son of Hanns and Erla Ludin. His father served as ambassador to Slovakia during the Third Reich. As ambassador, Hanns Ludin signed orders that sent thousands of Jews to Auschwitz.

Malte directed a documentary film about his father, 2 or 3 Things I Know About Him, that opened at Film Forum in Manhattan on January 24, 2007.

References 
 Scott, A.O. (2007, January 24). Our Father, the Nazi Zealot: A Family Grapples With Its Burdens and Blind Spots. The New York Times, p. B5

External links

1942 births
Living people
German documentary film directors
German expatriates in Slovakia
Film people from Bratislava